Abdul Enrique Chiari Catuy (13 January 1971 – 15 July 2011) was a Panamanian football striker.

Club career
Nicknamed el Turco, Chiari played for local sides Sporting Colón and Árabe Unido, with whom he won 4 league titles. At the time of his death he was assistant coach at the club.

International career
He made his debut for Panama in a June 1992 friendly match against Honduras and earned 8 caps, scoring no goals. He has represented his country at the 1995 UNCAF Nations Cup.

His final international was a June 2000 friendly match against Ecuador.

Murder
In July 2011, Chiari was shot in front of the Estadio Armando Dely Valdés. He left his wife and seven children. He was buried at the Monte Esperanza cemetery.

References

External links

1971 births
2011 deaths
Sportspeople from Colón, Panama
Association football forwards
Panamanian footballers
Panama international footballers
C.D. Árabe Unido players
Male murder victims
People murdered in Panama
Panamanian murder victims
Deaths by firearm in Panama